The 56th Motorized Brigade is a formation of the Ukrainian Ground Forces. The brigade was activated on 23 February 2015 in the city of Dnipro in Dnipropetrovsk Oblast and took command of three volunteer territorial defence battalions. The brigade fought in the Russo-Ukrainian War and has functioned as a motorized brigade. In June 2019, it was announced the 56th Motorized Brigade will be transferred to the Ukrainian Naval Infantry and remain based in Mariupol as part of the effort to increase the size of Ukrainian Marine Corps to 4 brigades.

Current Structure 
As of 2017 the brigade's structure is as follows:

 56th Motorized Brigade, Mariupol
 Headquarters & Headquarters Company
 21st Motorized Infantry Battalion "Sarmat"
 23rd Motorized Infantry Battalion "Khortytsia"
 37th Motorized Infantry Battalion
 Brigade Artillery Group
 Headquarters & Target Acquisition Battery
 Howitzer Artillery Battalion (D-20)
 Anti-tank Artillery Battalion (MT-12 Rapira)
 Anti-Aircraft Missile Artillery Battalion
 Reconnaissance Company
 Tank Company
 Engineer Company
 Maintenance Company
 Logistic Company
 Signal Company
 Medical Company
 Sniper Platoon

References

Motorized brigades of Ukraine
Military units and formations established in 2015
Military units and formations of Ukraine in the war in Donbas